Inna Oleksandrivna Sayenko (born 8 March 1982 in Mariupol, Donetsk) is a Ukrainian hammer thrower. Her personal best throw is 70.96 metres, achieved in July 2008 in Kyiv. She competed at the 2008 Olympic Games without reaching the final.

Competition record

References

sports-reference

1982 births
Living people
Ukrainian female hammer throwers
Athletes (track and field) at the 2008 Summer Olympics
Olympic athletes of Ukraine
Competitors at the 2007 Summer Universiade
Competitors at the 2009 Summer Universiade
Sportspeople from Mariupol
21st-century Ukrainian women